Marion Senior High School is a public high school located in Marion, Virginia. It is part of the Smyth County Public Schools and its athletics compete in the AA Southwest District in Region IV.

Notable alumni
 Larry Bales, former football and baseball college coach
 Edd Houck, former Virginia State Senator

References

External links
 

Schools in Smyth County, Virginia
Public high schools in Virginia